The Chieftains Live!  is the first album by the Chieftains which was recorded live. It was recorded on tour in December 1976 at Symphony Hall in Boston and Massey Hall in Toronto.

Although the album sold well, it is Paddy Moloney's least favorite album. Moloney was quoted as saying, "I don't know what they did to it technically, but I know it plays too fast!"

Track listing 
 "The Morning Dew" - 3:32
 "George Brabazon" - 2:56
 "Kerry Slides" - 3:52
 "Carrickfergus" - 3:49
 "Carolan's Concerto" - 3:09
 "The Foxhunt" - 4:42
 "Round the House and Mind the Dresser" - 2:54
 "Solos: Caitlin Trail / For The Sakes Of Old Decency / Carolan's Farewell To Music / Banish Misfortune / The Tarbolton / The Pinch Of Snuff / The Star Of Munster / The Flogging Reel" - 13:51
 "Limerick's Lamentation" - 3:54
 "O'Neill's March" - 3:37
 "Ril Mhor" - 3:23

Personnel 
 Paddy Moloney - uillean pipes, tin whistle
 Seán Potts - tin whistle, bodhrán, bones
 Seán Keane - fiddle, tin whistle
 Martin Fay - fiddle, bones
 Michael Tubridy - flute, concertina and tin whistle
 Derek Bell - neo-Irish harp, medieval harps, tiompán, oboe
 Kevin Conneff - bodhrán

References 

The Chieftains albums
1977 live albums
Claddagh Records albums
Albums recorded at Massey Hall